Walter Lamplough (31 August 1866 – 6 September 1918) was a South African cricketer. He played in two first-class matches for Border in 1897/98.

See also
 List of Border representative cricketers

References

External links
 

1866 births
1918 deaths
South African cricketers
Border cricketers